This is a list of programs produced by All3Media, the UK's largest independent television, film and digital production and distribution company and is currently a 50:50 joint venture between Warner Bros. Discovery  and Liberty Global. The company was formed in 2003 after the Chrysalis Group's television arm was acquired and rebranded North One.

Television series and miniseries

South Pacific Pictures

North One Television

Objective Media Group

Objective Fiction

Triple Brew Media

Betty

Panda Television

Second Star Productions

Neal Street Productions

Angelica Films

Two Brothers Pictures

West Road Pictures

Raw TV

Television films & specials

Lime Pictures
 Ingenious (2009)

Wise Owl Films
 Rock on, Tommy: The Bobby Ball Story (2020)
 Second Hand for 50 Grand (2021)
 Goodbye Brooklyn Nine Nine (2022)

South Pacific Pictures
 The Rogue Stallion (1990)
 Clarence (1990)
 Old Scores (1991)
 The Girl from Mars (1993)
 The Man Who Lost His Head (2007)

Optomen
 Feral Families (2017)
 A&E Live (2018)
 The Parachute Murder Plot (2018)
 Sarah Payne: The Untold Story (2019)
 Hatton Garden: The Inside Story (2019)
 Page Three: The Naked Truth (2020)
 Sort Out Your Life (2021)
 The Real Manhunt, The Night Stalker (2021)

Objective Media Group
 Kookyville (2012) 
 The Falkirk Cowboys (2019) (as Objective Media Group Scotland) (co-production with BBC Scotland)

Story Films
 The Cure (2019)
 NHS Heroes: Fighting to Save Our Lives (2020)

Objective Fiction
 Eric, Ernie and Me (2017)

North One Television
 Britain's Biggest Brood (2003)
 The Curse of Noel Edmonds (2004)
 Britain's 50 Greatest Comedy Sketches (2005)
 It's Not Easy Being a Wolf Boy (2005)
 My 100,000 Lovers (2005)
 The World's Greatest Actor (2006)
 The Perfect Vagina (2008)
 The 100 Greatest World Cup Moments of All Time! (2010)
 Stephen Fry's 100 Greatest Gadgets (2011)
 Britain's Favourite Christmas Songs (2011)
 Unforgettable: The Sweeney (2012)
 From Romania to Love (2013)
 80's The Best of Bad TV (2015)
 When Celebrites Go Pop (2016)
 The Barbara Windsor Story (2017)
 Guy Martin WW1 Tank (2017)
 The Big Fat Lies About Diet & Exercise (2019)
 Shopping for a New Penis (2020)
 Falklands War: The Forgotten Battle (2022)

Lion Television
 Dickens in America (2005)
 The First Emperor: The Man Who Made China (2006)
 Daniel Libeskind: The Making of an Architect (2007)
 Eygpt's Lost Queens (2014)
 Offended by Irvine Welsh (2020)
 Being Mum with MND (2022)

Company Pictures
 Tom Brown's Schooldays (2005)
 Mansfield Park (2007)
 Who Gets the Dog? (2007)

References

All3Media
Lists of television series
Television series by All3Media